Maria Schaumayer (7 October 1931 Graz – 28 January 2013 Vienna ) was an Austrian economist and politician ( ÖVP ). From 1990 to 1995, she was President of the Oesterreichische Nationalbank. She was the first woman to hold this position. In 1996, she was named an honorary citizen of Vienna. She was awarded the Decoration of Honour for Services to the Republic of Austria.

Life 
She graduated from University of Innsbruck, and Vienna University of Economics and Business. She worked for Creditanstalt. From 1965 to 1973, she was an executive city councilor of Vienna, for the Austrian People's Party.

From 1982 to 1989, she was Chief Financial Officer at OMV. From 1990 to 1995, she was President of the Oesterreichische Nationalbank. She was a commissioner for the  Austrian Fund for Reconciliation, Peace and Cooperation, which compensated 120,000 former forced laborers.

Legacy 
in 1991, she founded the Foundation for Women in Business, which awards prizes.

References 

1931 births
2013 deaths
20th-century Austrian economists
20th-century Austrian women politicians
Austrian People's Party politicians
Austrian women economists